Jack Radey (born 1947, Chicago, Illinois) is an American military historian and wargame designer. He set up People's War Games. He was a draft resister, and activist in the Vietnam anti-war movement.

He became interested in wargames when his school friend, David D. Friedman taught him how to play Tactics II.  Radey related how Friedman and himself wrote to Charles S. Roberts claiming that they had found a first turn winning strategy foreach of the two sides. Roberts replied that their interpretation of the rules was valid. He later moved to Merced, California where he graduated in 1964.

Jack also developed an early interest in politics: his mother's family were refugees from the Nazi regime in Germany. He was influenced by both the Civil Rights Movement and the Cuban Revolution, and went to work for the Communist Party of the United States of America both as a chauffeur/body guard for Gus Hall as well as for their education department. In 1964 he went to the University of California in Berkeley where he was involved with the Berkeley Free Speech Movement, getting arrested during the Sproul Hall sit-in.

Radey's political sympathies influenced his decision to publish his first game Korsun Pocket, which dealt with the Soviet Union's Red Army's victory at the Battle of the Korsun–Cherkassy Pocket. When interviewed by Fire & Movement he denied that his sympathies made his game biased, but rather condemned writers such as Paul Carell and Simulations Publications, Inc. for bias. He argued that the role of a wargame designer was to "teach something real about history" and said he hoped that the wargaming hobby would "promote peace not war and treat history with the respect it deserves". Radey also said that he supported the Soviet invasion of Afghanistan which had started at the end of 1979.

Games
The following games by Radey were published by People's War Games:
 1979 Korsun Pocket: Little Stalingrad on the Dnepr – January 25th to February 17th, 1944
 1982 Black Sea Black Death
 1983 Kirovograd
 1983 Aachen
 1985 Duel for Kharkov
 1997 Operation Spark: the Relief of Leningrad 1943

Books
 The Defense of Moscow 1941: The Northern Flank (with Charles Sharp) (2012)

Reference

1947 births
Living people
American communists
American game designers
Board game designers